Werckmeister Harmonies is a 2000 Hungarian drama film directed by Béla Tarr and Ágnes Hranitzky, based on the 1989 novel The Melancholy of Resistance by László Krasznahorkai. Shot in black-and-white and composed of thirty-nine languidly paced shots, the film shows János and his uncle György during the communist Hungarian era. It also shows their journey among helpless citizens as a dark circus comes to town casting an eclipse over their lives.

The title refers to the baroque musical theorist Andreas Werckmeister. György Eszter, a major character in the film, gives a monologue propounding a theory that Werckmeister's harmonic principles are responsible for aesthetic and philosophical problems in all music since, and need to be undone by a new theory of tuning and harmony.

Werckmeister Harmonies opened to wide acclaim from film critics, and has come to be regarded by many critics as one of the best films of the 2000s, ranking 58th on a 2016 BBC poll of the best films since 2000.

Plot 
It is set in an anonymous, desolate, isolated small town in Hungary during Communist times.

The film starts with János Valuska, a young newspaper-delivery man, conducting a poem and dance with drunken bar patrons. The dance is of the total eclipse of the sun, which disturbs, then silences the animals. It finishes with the grand return of the warm sunlight.

János is devoted to his uncle György, a composer and musicologist, who is like a father to him. György records his observations about the imperfection and compromise of the musical scale, as defined by Andreas Werckmeister. György proposes changes to the scale to make its harmonies more natural.

János goes to the post office to pick up his newspapers for delivery. The workers are unsettled by the ominous signs of the circus' arrival and are disturbed by the cloud that settles over each town it visits.

A “circus” built around a huge stuffed smelly whale and its star performer, "The Prince", who is never seen, come to town in the silence and darkness of night. János sees them arrive and philosophizes about God and the whale.

György's estranged wife, Tünde, tries to leverage her political and social status by giving György a list of names to recruit for the "Clean Up the Town movement," with the blessing of the police chief, and demands that György become chairman of the movement, or else she will move back in with him that very evening. She sends her suitcase ahead of her with János. György's struggling cobbler brother, Uncle Lajos, gets the list and passes it on to the agitated throbbing masses in the town square who are unhappy with the failing public services. János is accosted by a thug in front of the open truck housing the whale. Tünde sleeps with the drunk gun-toting police chief.

The presence of the whale and the “Prince” stir up the masses. János overhears the circus master losing control of his faceless Prince, who is becoming drunk with his own voice of revolutionary dogma. The circus master disowns him. The Prince, now free, inflames the masses, and the people riot. The rioters are brutal. The rioters, holding clubs, march, then run, into a psychiatric hospital where dissidents opposing the regime are kept, drag them out of their beds and beat them. When the rioters finally find a helpless old naked patient, who is all skin and bones, and who looks like a “musulman” in a Nazi concentration camp, they see their impotent, sad and powerless selves and withdraw silently.

After the riot, János comes across the diary of a rioter. It explains that the rioters did not know what they were angry with; so they were angry at everything. Then it recounts the mob's horrendous rape of two post-office girls.

János comes across his killed cobbler uncle Lajos, who got naively involved in the riot. János is told, by this cobbler's wife, to leave town at once for his own safety, as his name was on a list held by the rioters.

János runs away on the railroad tracks but is intercepted by a helicopter. He finds himself committed to a mental institution with caged beds (a tool of the time for dealing with political dissidents). János appears drugged and broken.

György, his composer uncle, is evicted from their house but gets to live in a shed in the garden whilst György's former wife, Tünde, with her new status as a collaborator, now occupies the big house with the police chief.

György tells a vacant János, in the ward, that if he is released from the mental institution they can live contentedly together in the shed with his piano. György also mentions that he has re-tuned the piano so that is now like any other, a personal capitulation apparently abandoning any present hopes of reform. János just stares.

The film ends with György looking directly into the eye of the whale, then, walking away and looking back at the now sad and disheveled whale, whose “circus” was destroyed by the rioters the night before, its rotting carcass slowly enveloped by the fog which gets whiter and brighter. Warm bright sunlight returns.

Cast 
 Lars Rudolph as János Valuska
 Peter Fitz as György Eszter
 Hanna Schygulla as Tünde Eszter
 János Derzsi as the Man In The Broad-Cloth Coat
 Đoko Rosić as the Man In Western Boots
 Tamás Wichmann as the Man In The Sailor-Cap
 Ferenc Kállai as the Circus Master
Péter Dobai as the Police Captain

Reception 
Werckmeister Harmonies received much critical acclaim. On Metacritic, the film received a weighted average score of 92/100 (based on eight reviews), which translates to "universal acclaim". Based on 39 reviews, Rotten Tomatoes reports a 98% approval rating, with an average score of 8.5/10.

Lawrence van Gelder of The New York Times called the film "elusive" and argued that it "beckons filmgoers who complain about the vapidity of Hollywood movie making and yearn for a film to ponder and debate." David Sterritt, writing for the Christian Science Monitor, awarded it a full four stars, remarking, "Tarr wants to stir the imagination and awaken the conscience of his audience rather than divert us with easy entertainment."

In a 2016 poll by BBC, the film was listed as one of the top 100 films since 2000 (56th position).

Film critic Roger Ebert described the movie as "unique and original", writing that it "feels as much like cinéma vérité as the works of Frederick Wiseman." He went on to add the film to his "Great Movies" collection in 2007.

In the British Film Institute's decennial Sight & Sound poll, 10 critics and five directors voted Werckmeister Harmonies among their 10 favorite films — placing it 171st in the critics' poll and 132nd in the directors' poll. According to They Shoot Pictures, Don't They, a website which statistically calculates the most well-received movies, it is the 21st most acclaimed movie since 2000.

References

External links
 
 
 

2000 films
2000 drama films
2000s Hungarian-language films
Films based on Hungarian novels
Films directed by Béla Tarr
Films with screenplays by László Krasznahorkai
Hungarian drama films
2001 drama films
2001 films